The Burkinabè Communist Group (GCB) was a communist party in Burkina Faso. The GCB surged as a split from the Voltaic Revolutionary Communist Party in 1983, following the refusal of PCRV to support the revolutionary government of Thomas Sankara.

In 1986 the GCB signed a declaration, together with the Reconstructed Communist Struggle Union, Union of Burkinabè Communists and Revolutionary Military Organization, calling for revolutionary unity. At that time the GCB held one minister in the government, Watamou Lamien, Minister of Information and Culture.

In 1989 the GCB left the government, following its refusal to join ODP/MT. The GCB turned clandestine. In April 1989 it split in two factions, one led by Salif Diallo joined the ODP/MT. The other, led by Jean-Marc Palm became the Movement for Socialist Democracy (MDS) in March 1991.

Formerly ruling communist parties
Political parties established in 1983
Communist parties in Burkina Faso
Defunct political parties in Burkina Faso